Eudrepanulatrix is a genus of moths in the family Geometridae first described by Rindge in 1949.

Species
 Eudrepanulatrix rectifascia (Hulst, 1896)

References

Caberini